Albert Martin may refer to:

 Albert Martin (sailor), Scottish sailor
 Albert Martin (soldier) (1808–1836), defender of the Alamo
 Albert C. Martin Sr. (1879–1960), Los Angeles architect
 Albert C. Martin Jr. (1913–2006), Los Angeles architect
 Albert Edward Martin (1876–1936), English merchant and politician
 Albert Martin (pentathlete), British Olympic modern pentathlete
 Al Martin (Albert Lee Martin, born 1967), left fielder in Major League Baseball
 Al Martin (second baseman) (Albert DeGroot 1847–1915)

See also
Alberto Martín (born 1978), tennis player from Spain
Albert De Martin (born 1951), politician from Quebec, Canada
Al Martin (disambiguation)